High Voltage Radio (identified as Triple M's High Voltage Radio in Sydney, Melbourne, Brisbane and Adelaide and Mix 94.5's High Voltage Radio in Perth) was a pop up Digital Radio station broadcasting nationally in Australia while AC/DC were touring the country in 2010. The station was part of Austereo's Triple M Network and only played AC/DC music.

Programming
The station exclusively played music by AC/DC and included the band's biggest hits, album tracks, live performances and rarities. Byron Cooke, the anchor of Triple M Sydney's Grill Team, was the host of the station and conducted interviews with the band, talked to people going to the concerts and talked about unknown AC/DC trivia.

Due to the "pop up" nature of the station, it was only broadcast in Australia between Wednesday, 10 February and Monday, 15 March 2010 to coincide with AC/DC's Australian Black Ice tour. After Monday, 15 March 2010, the station was reformatted to become Lady Gaga only, under the name of Radio Gaga.

Availability
The station was heard on DAB+ radios in Sydney, Melbourne, Brisbane, Adelaide and Perth.

The station also streamed online at the Triple M website.

External links 
High Voltage Radio Player

References

Digital radio in Australia
Digital-only radio stations
Classic rock radio stations in Australia
Radio stations established in 2010
Radio stations disestablished in 2010
Defunct radio stations in Australia